is a former Japanese football player and manager.

Playing career
Togashi was born in Kanagawa Prefecture on July 15, 1971. He joined Yomiuri (later Verdy Kawasaki) from youth team in 1990. He could hardly play in the match. He moved to Yokohama Flügels in 1995. However he could hardly play in the match and he moved to Japan Football League club Consadole Sapporo. He played as center back and the club was promoted to J1 League end of 1997 season. He retired end of 1997 season.

Coaching career
After retirement, in 1998, Togashi started coaching career at Verdy Kawasaki (later Tokyo Verdy). In 2002, he moved to Consadole Sapporo. In 2003, he returned to Verdy. He mainly served as manager for youth team. In September 2014, top team manager Yasutoshi Miura was sacked and Togashi became a new manager as Miura successor. He managed the club until 2016.

Club statistics

Managerial statistics

References

External links
 
 

1971 births
Living people
Association football people from Kanagawa Prefecture
Japanese footballers
Japan Soccer League players
J1 League players
Japan Football League (1992–1998) players
Tokyo Verdy players
Yokohama Flügels players
Hokkaido Consadole Sapporo players
Japanese football managers
J2 League managers
Tokyo Verdy managers
Association football defenders